DME Academy is a private athletic sports training academy based in Daytona Beach, Florida for post-graduate basketball players. During its first year in existence, DME Academy's National Team, The DME Lakers, reached the National Prep Championships at Albertus Magnus College in New Haven, Connecticut. The DME Lakers lost to Putnam Science in the quarter-finals.

In the 2016 National Prep Championships, DME was eliminated by Putnam Science Academy (93-66)

History 
DME Academy was established in 2015 as a Post Grad Basketball Training Academy. The property sits on a ten-acre campus adjacent to the Daytona Beach Airport and within eyesight of the Daytona 500.

Facility 
DME Academy currently resides in the DME Sports facility, a 47,000 square foot event center. The facility consists of 2 full NBA courts, a shooting lab, a 2500 square foot video studio, a state of the art film room, 10,000 square foot strength and conditioning area and a 60 yard by 40 yard outdoor synthetic turf area for speed and agility training. The facility compares to top NBA practice facilities. The facility is not open to the public and serves the academy and other high-profile athletes. Academy students have 24/7 access.

Programs

7-Month Post Graduate 
The program assists high school graduates in basketball training. The season consists of a seven-month, thirty game season with potential playoff tournaments. DME Academy houses and feeds student athletes daily.

Intensive Summer Camp Schedule 
DME Academy's Intensive Summer Camp is designed to test the physical and mental strength of student athletes through 2.5 - 3 hour sessions per day with 12 basketball coaches. DME Academy houses and feeds student athletes daily, utilizing beachfront accommodations.

References 

Sports in Daytona Beach, Florida
Sports academies
Basketball in Florida
2015 establishments in Florida
Educational institutions established in 2015